Ngamthang Haokip is a former Minister of Manipur and member of the Indian National Congress. Haokip was elected as a member of the Manipur Legislative Assembly from Saitu constituency in Kangpokpi District from the Indian National Congress in 2017. He resigned from Indian National Congress and later joined Bharatiya Janata Party.

Manipur Legislative Assembly from Saitu constituency in Kangpokpi District from the Indian National Congress in 2017.

During the 2020 Manipur vote of confidence, he was one of the eight MLAs who had skipped the assembly proceedings defying the party whip for the trust vote. He resigned from Indian National Congress and later joined Bharatiya Janata Party in presence of Ram Madhav, Baijayant Panda and Chief Minister of Manipur N. Biren Singh.

History
 Elected MLA from 51-Saitu(ST) A/C, 5th Manipur Legislative Assembly 1990
 Elected MLA from 51-Saitu(ST) A/C, 6th Manipur Legislative Assembly 1995
 Elected MLA from 51-Saitu(ST) A/C, 8th Manipur Legislative Assembly 2002
 Elected MLA from 51-Saitu(ST) A/C, 10th Manipur Legislative Assembly 2012
 Elected MLA from 51-Saitu(ST) A/C, 11th Manipur Legislative Assembly 2017.

References

Living people
Manipur MLAs 1990–1995
Manipur MLAs 1995–2000
Manipur MLAs 2012–2017
Manipur MLAs 2002–2007
Manipur MLAs 2017–2022
Manipur politicians
Bharatiya Janata Party politicians from Manipur
Year of birth missing (living people)
Indian National Congress politicians from Manipur
People from Kangpokpi district